Ana Buceta Rodríguez (born 4 December 1992) is a Spanish footballer who plays as a midfielder for Segunda División Pro club Málaga CF. Previously she played for FVPR El Olivo.

As a member of the Spain Under-19 team she has played the 2010 and 2011 UEFA U-19 European Championships.

References

External links
Profile at La Liga 

Profile at Txapeldunak.com 

1992 births
Living people
Spanish women's footballers
Primera División (women) players
Levante UD Femenino players
Málaga CF Femenino players
Footballers from Moaña
Footballers from Pontevedra
Women's association football midfielders
Real Oviedo (women) players
Primera Federación (women) players
Spain women's youth international footballers
21st-century Spanish women